Jan Verstraeten (born 11 March 1978 in Lier) is a Belgian professional racing cyclist.

Career highlights

 1999: 2nd in Moerbeke, Cyclo-cross (BEL)
 2000: 3rd in Brussel - Opwijk (BEL)
 2000: 3rd in GP Wielerrevue (NED)
 2000: 1st in Circuit du Hainaut (BEL)
 2000: 1st in Stage 3 Tour de Liège, Blegny-Mine (BEL)
 2000: 1st in Stage 5 Tour de Liège, Seraing (BEL)
 2003: 3rd in Oostende, Cyclo-cross (BEL)
 2003: 3rd in Schriek, Derny (BEL)
 2004: 2nd in Huijbergen, Cyclo-cross (NED)
 2005: 1st in GP Etienne de Wilde (BEL)
 2005: 3rd in Ardooie, Cyclo-cross (BEL)
 2006: 2nd in Zonnebeke, Cyclo-cross (BEL)
 2006: 3rd in GP Etienne de Wilde (BEL)
 2006: 1st in Kayl, Cyclo-cross (LUX)
 2007: 3rd in Otegem, Cyclo-cross (BEL)
 2008: 2nd in Otegem, Cyclo-cross (BEL)

External links

1978 births
Living people
Belgian male cyclists
Cyclo-cross cyclists
People from Lier, Belgium
Cyclists from Antwerp Province